Bou is a commune in the Loiret department in north-central France. The village is situated in the greater Orléans area, in a meander of the river Loire, 14 km east of Orléans and 9 km west of the town of Jargeau. Bou is separated by fields from the villages of Mardié and Chécy, which lie to the north. The village of Bou was traditionally an agricultural area, producing cereal crops and vegetables and a local wine known as Gris-meunier. The inhabitants of Bou are known as Boumiens.

Population

See also
 Communes of the Loiret department

References

Communes of Loiret